Gregor Gazvoda (born 15 October 1981) is a Slovenian former professional racing cyclist, who currently works as a directeur sportif for UCI Continental team .

Career
He was the first Slovenian cyclist to win a 2.HC race at Tour of Qinghai Lake. It was the points he gathered at the UCI Asia Tour that helped him get a contract with a UCI ProTour team for 2012.

Gazvoda rejoined  for the 2014 season, after his previous team –  – folded at the end of the 2013 season.

Major results

2002
 8th Overall Olympia's Tour
1st Stage 8 (ITT)
 8th Overall Grand Prix Guillaume Tell
 9th Time trial, UCI Under-23 Road World Championships
2004
 2nd Time trial, National Road Championships
2005
 National Road Championships
1st  Time trial
2nd Road race
 1st Stage 7 Vuelta a Cuba
2007
 2nd Time trial, National Road Championships
 3rd Overall Course de Solidarność et des Champions Olympiques
 9th Chrono des Nations
2008
 National Road Championships
1st  Time trial
3rd Road race
 1st Tour of Vojvodina II
 1st Stage 4 (ITT) Circuit des Ardennes
 6th Chrono des Nations
 9th Ljubljana–Zagreb
2009
 2nd Time trial, National Road Championships
2010
 1st  Time trial, National Road Championships
 1st Stage 2 Tour of Qinghai Lake
 8th Tour of Taihu Lake
2011
 1st Overall Tour of Qinghai Lake
1st Stage 3
 1st Tour of Vojvodina I
 3rd Road race, National Road Championships
 6th Banja Luka–Belgrade I
2012
 2nd Time trial, National Road Championships
2013
 5th Philadelphia International Cycling Classic
2014
 1st  Time trial, National Road Championships
2017
 2nd Time trial, National Road Championships

References

External links

1981 births
Living people
Sportspeople from Maribor
Slovenian male cyclists
European Games competitors for Slovenia
Cyclists at the 2015 European Games